"Slow Burn" is a song by English musician David Bowie. It was released as the lead single from his 22nd studio album, Heathen, on 3 June 2002. The song was not released as a single in the UK. There was no British single from Heathen released until September, with "Everyone Says 'Hi'". The recording features Pete Townshend on guitar. The song earned Bowie a Grammy nomination for Best Rock Male Vocal Performance.

Cover Art
The cover photograph by Markus Klinko, featuring Bowie striding forward with a baby in his arms, is a composite of two images. Bowie's head is grafted onto the body of a male model photographed separately.

Music video
The music video of "Slow Burn" was directed by Gary Koepke, and released in 2002. A music video for "Slow Burn" was uploaded to the official DavidBowieVEVO YouTube channel on 23 March 2011. The video shows Bowie dressed in white performing the vocals to the song in a recording studio booth, with a young girl wandering around the darkened control room and occasionally touching the equipment and mixing desk. The video is an edited version of the song and no directing or other credits are given.

Live versions
The song was performed live on several TV shows in 2002, although was only performed during the first two dates of the Heathen Tour and during a promotional performance at Sony Music Studios in New York between those two dates.

Track listing

CDs
 ISO-Columbia / 672744 1 (Austria)
 "Slow Burn" – 4:43
 "Wood Jackson" – 4:48
 "Shadow Man" – 4:46

 ISO-Columbia / COL 672744 2 (Austria)
 "Slow Burn" – 4:43
 "Wood Jackson" – 4:48
 "Shadow Man" – 4:46
 "When the Boys Come Marching Home" – 4:46
 "You've Got a Habit of Leaving" – 4:51

 Sony / SICP-162 (Japan)
 "Slow Burn" (edit) – 3:55
 "Shadow Man" – 4:46
 "When the Boys Come Marching Home" – 4:46
 "You've Got a Habit of Leaving" – 4:51
 "Baby Loves That Way" – 4:44

Personnel
 Producers
 David Bowie
 Tony Visconti
Musicians
David Bowie – Vocals, Horns
Pete Townshend – Guitar
Tony Visconti – Bass guitar, Recorders, B-vox, String arrangements
Matt Chamberlain – Drums, Loop programming, Percussion
David Torn – Guitars, Guitar loops, Omnichord
Jordan Rudess – Piano and Hammond organ.
The Scorchio Quartet
Greg Kitzis – 1st violin
Meg Okura – 2nd violin
Martha Mooke – Viola
Mary Wooten – Cello

Charts

References

External links
 
 Slow Burn (work) on MusicBrainz.org.

2002 singles
David Bowie songs
Songs written by David Bowie
Song recordings produced by Tony Visconti
Song recordings produced by David Bowie